Gulf Coast Blues and Impressions: A Hurricane Relief Benefit is the 15th album of pianist George Winston, and eleventh solo piano album, released in 2006. It is his last record with Windham Hill before the label's closure in 2007. It is his second benefit, recorded to raise funds to help victims of Hurricane Katrina.

Track listing

References

External links
Liner notes

2006 albums
George Winston albums
Hurricane Katrina disaster relief charity albums
Dancing Cat Records albums